Kelston Girls’ College (KGC) is a single-sex girls state secondary school in Kelston, a suburb in West Auckland, New Zealand. It was created in 1963 when the roll of Kelston High School (formed in 1954) became too large for the site on the corner of Archibald and Great North Roads. The boys moved to a new site further down Archibald Road and the original site became the home of Kelston Girls' High School (now Kelston Girls' College).

History

In 1888, New Lynn School, one of the first schools in West Auckland, was opened on the current site of Kelston Girls' College. In 1914, the school was relocated to its modern-day site on Hutchinson Avenue. In 1954 the Kelston High School, a co-educational school, was opened at the site of the old New Lynn School. It was the third high school to open in West Auckland, after Avondale College in 1945, and Henderson High School a year beforehand. Kelston High School was separated into two schools in 1963, with Kelston Girls' High School remaining at the site and Kelston Boys' High School moving to a new campus to the north. In 1993, a marae was established on the school grounds.

In 2004 Kelston Girls' High School Board of Trustees decided to undergo a change of name. Following consultation with the community, the school was renamed Kelston Girls' College. At the time Board chairwoman Rosemary Caldwell commented that the name change would help to attract international students.

Curriculum
Kelston Girls' College is a Te Kotahitanga school. Te Kotahitanga is an education style aimed at raising Māori student achievement. It prescribes that the student is at the centre of learning in the classroom and that culturally responsive relational trust is the focus of all teachers.

Demographics
As of 2014 the school's ethnic composition was as follows:
Māori 16%
NZ European/Pākehā 4%
Samoan 30%
Tongan 11%
Fijian 6%
Middle Eastern 6%
Indian 5%
African 3%
South East Asian 3%
Cook Island Māori 2%
Niue 4%
other Pacific 8%
other 2%

Kelston Girls' College receives a number of students who have come to New Zealand as refugees. These students are supported with an orientation programme, regular homework tutorials and career planning.

Hauora centre
Kelston Girls' College has an onsite Hauora centre. Students have access to a doctor, registered nurse, physiotherapist, guidance counsellors, youth work, social worker and family planning services. The purpose-built centre aims to support students' physical, emotional and mental health.

Notable alumni

Justice Debra Mortimer, Justice of the Federal Court of Australia.

Sport
Brenda Matthews – athletics, represented NZ at the 1972 Summer Olympics, 1996 & 1974 Commonwealth Games
Monalisa Codling – rugby, Black Ferns
Linda Itunu – rugby, Black Ferns
Aldora Itunu – rugby, Black Ferns
Beverly Weigel – athletics, represented NZ at the 1956 & 1960 Summer Olympics, 1958 British Empire and Commonwealth Games

Notable staff 
 Haidee Tiffen – cricket, White Ferns

References

External links
 

Secondary schools in Auckland
1963 establishments in New Zealand
Educational institutions established in 1963
Girls' schools in New Zealand
Schools in West Auckland, New Zealand